Decade: "...but wait it gets worse" is the second studio album by Onyx member Sticky Fingaz, released on April 29, 2003 by D3 Entertainment. The album is the follow-up to Black Trash: The Autobiography of Kirk Jones.

Decade was produced by several producers including Scott Storch, S-Man, DSP and Sticky Fingaz. It features guest appearances from Onyx's member Fredro Starr, Onyx's affiliate X1, actor Omar Epps, Missy Elliott and others.

The album picked at number 176 on the US Billboard 200, number 37 on the Top R&B/Hip Hop Albums and debuted at number 9 on the Top Independent Albums chart.

Background 
Sticky Fingaz made a deal with D3 Entertainment to release one album. He chose this label because he into owning his masters and getting the most from his work, 7 dollars a record over here. Basically, D3 Entertainment is just like a distributor and the really label is OPM aka Other People's Money.

The first half for the album title, "Decade...", refers to 2003 being the 10th anniversary since the first Onyx album was released. The second half, "But Wait It Gets Worse", is a reference to a lyric from Sticky's verse in Onyx's 1993 hit single "Slam" and was intended to help lead up to Sticky’s third solo album "A Day in the Life of Sticky Fingaz", which was released later in 2009. The song "I Love da Streets" was said to be Sticky's favorite song on the album.

The album is dedicated to the memory of the late DJ of Run-D.M.C., Jam Master Jay, Sticky Fingaz mentor."...I dedicate this album to my mentor, my brother, the N*gga that put me on. I am not going to mourn his death, I am going to celebrate his life!"

The album was released in two versions: one is an enhanced disc which features a short behind the scenes documentary on the making of album, and the other without. The album is now out of print.

Track listing

Personnel 
Credits for Decade: "...but wait it gets worse" adapted from AllMusic.

 Columbo - Featured Artist, Guest Artist, Vocals
 Detroit Diamond - Featured Artist, Guest Artist, Vocals
 DSP - Producer
 Omar Epps - Executive Producer, Featured Artist, Guest Artist, Vocals
 Geneveese - Featured Artist
 Iceman - Primary Artist
 K. Jones - Composer
 Kirk T. Jones - Composer
 Lex & Thirty - Featured Artist
 Brian Porizek - Artwork, Design
 Porky - Producer
 My Quan - Featured Artist
 Rio - Featured Artist
 Riviera - Record Label
 The S-Man - Producer
 Seven O.D. - Featured Artist
 Fredro Starr - Executive Producer, Featured Artist, Guest Artist, Vocals
 Sticky Fingaz - Executive Producer, Primary Artist, Producer, Vocals
 Scott Storch - Executive Producer, Producer
 Esbjörn Svensson Trio - Featured Artist
 30 - Guest Artist, Vocals
 X 1 - Guest Artist, Vocals
 X-1 - Featured Artist
 Debra Young - Photography

Charts

Weekly charts

References

External links 
 Decade: "...but wait it gets worse" at Discogs
 Decade: "...but wait it gets worse" at RapGenius

2003 albums
Sticky Fingaz albums
Albums produced by Scott Storch